Northern High School may refer to:

Northern High School (Accident, Maryland)
Northern High School (Baltimore), Maryland, defunct
Northern High School (Owings, Maryland)
Northern High School (Detroit, Michigan)
Portage Northern High School, Portage, Michigan
Walled Lake Northern High School, White Lake, Michigan
Northern High School (Durham, North Carolina)
Northern High School (Dillsburg, Pennsylvania)
Northern Collegiate Institute and Vocational School, Sarnia, Ontario

See also
North High School (disambiguation)